John Andrew Richardson (30 October 1868 – 7 October 1938) was the third Bishop of Fredericton and later became Metropolitan of Canada

He was educated at Warwick School and St. John's College, University of Manitoba.  Ordained in 1895, he was Rector of St Luke's, Winnipeg and then of the Parish of Saint John (Trinity Church) in Saint John, NB before becoming Bishop Coadjutor and Dean of Fredericton in 1906. The following year he became its diocesan and in 1934 metropolitan of his province- posts he held until his death.

Notes

1868 births
People from Warwick
People educated at Warwick School
University of Manitoba alumni
Anglican bishops of Fredericton
20th-century Anglican Church of Canada bishops
Metropolitans of Canada
20th-century Anglican archbishops
1938 deaths